Dungannon is a town in County Tyrone, Northern Ireland. It is the second-largest town in the county (after Omagh) and had a population of 14,340 at the 2011 Census. The Dungannon and South Tyrone Borough Council had its headquarters in the town, though since 2015 the area has been covered by Mid-Ulster District Council.

For centuries, it was the 'capital' of the O'Neill dynasty of Tír Eoghain, who dominated most of Ulster and built a castle on the hill. After the O'Neills' defeat in the Nine Years' War, the English founded a plantation town on the site, which grew into what is now Dungannon. Dungannon has won Ulster in Bloom's Best Kept Town Award five times. It currently has the highest percentage of immigrants of any town in Northern Ireland.

History 
For centuries, Dungannon's fortunes were closely tied to that of the O'Neill dynasty which ruled a large part of Ulster until the 17th century. Dungannon was the clan's main stronghold. The traditional site of inauguration for 'The O'Neill' was Tullyhogue Fort, an Iron Age mound some four miles northeast of Dungannon. The clan O'Hagan were the stewards of this site for the O'Neills. In the 14th century the O'Neills built a castle on what is today known as Castle Hill; the location was ideal for a fort, for it was one of the highest points in the area and dominated the surrounding countryside, giving (depending on the weather) the ability to see seven counties.

This castle was burned in 1602 by Hugh O'Neill, 2nd Earl of Tyrone, as Crown forces under Lord Mountjoy closed in on the Gaelic lords towards the end of the Nine Years' War. In 1607, ninety-nine Irish chieftains and their followers, including Hugh O'Neill, set sail from Rathmullan, bound for the continent, in an event known as the Flight of the Earls. In what became known as the Plantation of Ulster, their lands were confiscated and awarded to Protestant English and Scots settlers; Dungannon and its castle were granted to Sir Arthur Chichester, the Lord Deputy of Ireland.

Sir Phelim O'Neill seized the town in the opening stages of the Irish Rebellion of 1641, and issued the Proclamation of Dungannon, in which the rebels set out their aims and proclaimed their loyalty to Charles I. O'Neill claimed they had been ordered to rise by the King, and later produced a forged commission in support of this. During the course of the Irish Confederate Wars, Dungannon changed hands several times; Scots Covenanter forces under Alexander Leslie captured it in September 1642, before O'Neill took it back in spring 1643.

In 1973, the town became the seat of the new district of the Dungannon and South Tyrone Borough Council. In 1782, the town was the location where the independence of the Irish Parliament was declared by members of the Protestant Ascendancy who controlled the parliament at the time.

The castle was partially excavated in October 2007 by the Channel 4 archaeological show Time Team, uncovering part of the moat and walls of the castle.

The Troubles 
In the late 1960s Northern Ireland was plunged into an ethnopolitical conflict known as the Troubles. On 24 August 1968, the Campaign for Social Justice (CSJ), the Northern Ireland Civil Rights Association (NICRA), and other groups, held Northern Ireland's first civil rights march from Coalisland to Dungannon. The rally was officially banned, but took place and passed off without incident. The publicity surrounding the march encouraged other groups to form branches of NICRA.

During the conflict Dungannon suffered numerous bombings, and almost 50 people were killed in and around the town. The deadliest attack was on 17 March 1976, when a loyalist car bomb killed four Catholic civilians.

Demography 
Dungannon had a population of 14,340 at the 2011 census, rising by 3,349 (over 30%) from 10,983 in 2001, making it one of the fastest growing towns in Northern Ireland. It has the highest percentage of immigrants of any town in Northern Ireland. Immigrants make up about 11% of its population; more than twice the average. Between 2001 and 2011, the number of immigrants in Dungannon increased tenfold; the biggest increase of any town. Many came to work in the local food processing plants. There have been several attacks on immigrants and clashes between rival groups of immigrants in the area.

The population of the town increased slightly overall during the 19th century:

On Census day (27 March 2011) there were 14,340 people living in Dungannon (5,388 households), accounting for 0.79% of the NI total. Of these:

 22.01% were aged under 16 years and 12.09% were aged 65 and over;
 50.33% of the usually resident population were female and 49.67% were male;
 64.82% belong to or were brought up in the Catholic Christian faith, 30.46% belong to or were brought up in a 'Protestant and Other Christian (including Christian related)' religion;
 31.63% had an Irish national identity, 28.27% indicated that they had a British national identity and 23.93% had a Northern Irish national identity (respondents could indicate more than one national identity);
 34 years was the average (median) age of the population;
 15.93% had some knowledge of Irish (Gaelic), 4.82% had some knowledge of Ulster-Scots and 23.18% did not have English as their first language.

Places of interest 

An interesting feature of the town is the former police barracks at the top right-hand corner of the market square which is quite unlike any other barracks of a similar vintage in Ireland. A popular but apocryphal story relates that the unusual design of this building is due to a mix-up with the plans in Dublin which meant Dungannon got a station designed for Nepal and they got a standard Irish barracks, complete with a traditional Irish fireplace. Dungannon Park covers seventy acres; it is centred round an idyllic still-water lake, with miles of pathways and views of the surrounding townland.

Geography 
Dungannon is in the southeast of County Tyrone, within the historic barony of Dungannon Middle and the civil parish of Drumglass.

The town grew up around a hill, known locally as Castle Hill. There are three small lakes on the southern edge of town, the biggest of which is Black Lough. There are also two parks in the eastern part of town: Dungannon Park and Windmill Park. Surrounding settlements include Moygashel (a village at the southern edge of Dungannon), Coalisland (to the northeast), Donaghmore (to the northwest), Eglish (to the south) and Castlecaulfield (to the west).

Townlands 
Dungannon sprang up in a townland called Drumcoo. Over time, the urban area has spread into the neighbouring townlands. Many of its roads and housing estates are named after them. The following is a list of these townlands and their likely etymologies:
Ballynorthland Park
Ballysaggart
Coolhill (from Cúlchoill meaning "the backwoods")
Drumcoo (from Druim Cuaiche meaning "ridge of the cuckoo")
Drumharriff (from Druim Thairbh meaning "ridge of the bull")
Gortmerron (from Gort Mearain meaning "Merron's field")
Killymaddy (from Coill na Madaí meaning "wood of the dogs")
Killymeal (from Coill na Maoile meaning "wood of the bald/hornless cow")
Lisnaclin (from Lios na Clinge meaning "ringfort of the bell chime")
Lisnahull (from Lios a' Choill meaning "ringfort of the hazel")
Lurgaboy (from Lurga Buí meaning "yellow shin" i.e. shin-shaped hill)
Mullaghadun (from Mullach a' Dúin meaning "hilltop of the fort")
Mullaghanagh (from Mullán na hÁithe meaning "hillock of the kiln")
Mullaghconor (from Mullach Conchobhair meaning "Conchobhar's hilltop")
Mullaghmore (from Mullach Mór meaning "big hilltop")

Economy 

Until its closure in 2010, the crystal glass producer Tyrone Crystal was based in Dungannon.

Schools 
Primary
Aughamullan (Holy Family) Primary School (RC)
Bush Primary School
Clintyclay Primary School
Derrylatinee Primary School (RC)
Donaghey Controlled Primary School
Dungannon Primary School
Killyman Primary School
Laghey Primary School (RC)
Lisfearty Primary School
Newmills Primary School
Orchard County Primary School (amalgamation of Annaghmore and Tullyroan primary schools)
St Mary's Primary School
St Patrick's Primary School
Tamnamore Primary School
Walker Memorial Primary School
Windmill Integrated Primary School

Secondary
Royal School Dungannon
Integrated College Dungannon
St Patrick's Academy, Dungannon
Drumglass High School
St Patricks's College, Dungannon

Transport 
Dungannon is linked to the M1 motorway, which runs from the southeast of the town to Belfast. There is an Ulsterbus town bus service that runs daily that serves the town's suburbs, formerly operated by the Optare Solo buses.

Former railways 
The Great Northern Railway took over the PD&O in 1876 and built a branch line from Dungannon to Cookstown in 1879.

The GNR Board cut back the Cookstown branch to Coalisland in 1956 and the Ulster Transport Authority (UTA) closed the branch altogether in 1959. In accordance with the Benson Report submitted to the Government of Northern Ireland 1963 the UTA closed the "Derry Road" through Dungannon in 1965. The site of Dungannon station is now a public park and the former trackbed through the station is now a greenway.

Notable people

1800s 
 Richard Dowse (1824–1890) – judge
 Henry W. Oliver (1840–1904) – Pittsburgh industrialist
 Thomas Wilson Spence (1846–1912) – Wisconsin lawyer and state politician
 George T. Oliver (1848–1919) – U.S. Senator
 Thomas J. Clarke (1858–1916) – first signatory of the 1916 Proclamation of the Irish Republic; executed by the British authorities
 Sister Nivedita (born Margaret Elizabeth Noble) (1867–1911) – social worker, author, teacher and disciple of Swami Vivekananda

1900s 
 Birdy Sweeney (1931–1999) – actor
 Austin Currie (born 1939) – former member of the Parliament of Northern Ireland and Dáil Éireann, attended St Patrick's Academy in Dungannon.
 Victor Sloan (born 1945) – artist
 Bernadette Devlin McAliskey (born 1947) – former British MP; Irish republican activist, attended St Patrick's Girls Academy in Dungannon.
 Gerry McKenna (born 1953) – MRIA, biologist, Senior Vice President of the Royal Irish Academy, Vice Chancellor and President of University of Ulster
 Dominic Gates (born 1954/1955) – journalist and Pulitzer Prize winner
 Adrian Logan (born 1955) – television presenter
 Gerry McGeough (born 1958) – Provisional Irish Republican Army volunteer; prison escapee.
 Darren Clarke (born 1968) – professional golfer
 Patrick Wallace (born 1969) – snooker player
 Ryan Farquhar (born 1976) – motorcycle racer
 Joanne Salley (born 1977) – television presenter
 Kris Meeke (born 1979) – rally driver
 Gareth Steenson (born 1984) – rugby union player
 Colin Morgan (born 1986) – actor, attended Integrated College Dungannon
 Fra Fee (born 1987) – film, stage actor
 Niall McGinn (born 1987) – footballer, Dungannon Swifts.
 Michaella McCollum Connolly – criminal (convicted drug smuggler)

Sport

Cricket 
Dungannon Cricket Club was established in 1865. Attempts were made to re-establish the club after the First World War and this was done in 1929 and survived until 1933 when Lord Ranfurly died, which for a second time left the club without a ground. Cricket was kept alive by the Royal School, Bankers and the RUC until 1939 when the Second World War broke out. The club was reformed in 1948 mainly due to the efforts of Eddie Hodgett and the NCU leagues in 1952 and continues to do so to the present time. The club has never quite reached senior cricket as it has limited resources and relies on the District Council for a ground. The club has played on at least five different locations during its existence. Home games are played at Dungannon Park.

Football 
Dungannon Swifts F.C. is the town's local team, which plays in the NIFL Premiership, and is Tyrone's only representative in the league, following Omagh Town's collapse. The club represented Northern Ireland in European competition in the 2006 UEFA Intertoto Cup and the 2007–08 UEFA Cup.

Gaelic games 
The local boys' Gaelic football club is Dungannon Thomas Clarkes (Thomáis Uí Chléirigh Dún Geanainn) while the ladies' football team is Aodh a Ruadh.

Golf 
Dungannon Golf Club, which provides an 18-hole course, appointed its first woman captain in January 2022.

Hare coursing 
The local Hare Coursing Club has been in existence since the 1920s but the sport was popular in the area long before the formation of the club. With hare coursing currently banned in Northern Ireland, the Dungannon club organises meetings in the Republic of Ireland.

Greyhound racing 
Greyhound racing was once a popular sport in Dungannon. The Dungannon Greyhound Stadium was opened in July 1930, the third track in Northern Ireland after Celtic Park and Dunmore Stadium. The stadium, also known as the Oaks Park Greyhound Stadium, remained operational until January 2003 when it was closed by Dungannon (Oaks Park) Stadium Greyhound Racing Limited who had taken over the track in 1995 and saw the opportunity to make a substantial profit by developing the site.

Rugby 
Dungannon Rugby FC, founded in 1873, was one of the first towns in Ireland to form a rugby club.

See also 
 Abbeys and priories in Northern Ireland (County Tyrone)
 List of towns and villages in Northern Ireland
 List of localities in Northern Ireland by population
 O'Neill dynasty
 Tullyhogue Fort

References

Sources

External links 

Dungannon Enterprise Centre
Dungannon Life
A Flavour of Tyrone – Dungannon

 
O'Neill dynasty
Towns in County Tyrone